Francesco Maria Zanotti Cavazzoni (Bologna, 6 January 1692 – Bologna, 25 December 1777) was an Italian philosopher and writer.  Besides being a writer, he was also a commentator on works of art. He was considered an authoritative source on many topics.

Life
He was the son of Giampietro Zanotti, and a pupil of Eustachio Manfredi. In 1718 he became professor of philosophy at the University of Bologna, and in 1723 he was appointed as secretary of Luigi Ferdinando Marsigli. Initially a Cartesian, he became a follower of Newton. In 1728 Francesco Algarotti experimented with light in his lab, replicating the prism and spectrum experiments of Isaac Newton. In 1741 he became a Fellow of the Royal Society.

Zanotti's 1741 essay on the 'attractive force of ideas' defended a view of the association of ideas influenced by Newtonian physics. In 1754 Zanotti criticised Pierre-Louis Maupertuis for his views on Stoicism and Christianity, and was drawn into controversy about Stoicism with the Dominican professor Casto Innocenzio Ansaldi.

In 1766 he became president of Institute of Science in Bologna. In 1775 Benjamin Wilson (painter) began a correspondence with Zanotti on phosphor.

Other members of the family
His brother, Giampietro Cavazzoni Zanotti was a Writer, painter, and art historian; Eustachio Zanotti was a famous astronomer and hydraulic engineer.

Works

La forza attrattiva delle idee (1747)
La filosofia morale secondo i peripatetici (1754)
Dell'arte poetica (1758)
Lettere famigliari in difesa della Felsina Pittrice
Delle lodi delle belle arti
Dialogo in difesa di G. Reni

References

External links
 

1777 deaths
1692 births
Academic staff of the University of Bologna
Italian philosophers
18th-century Italian philosophers
Fellows of the Royal Society